Ralf Hoyer (born 13 April 1950) is a German composer.

Life 
Born in Berlin, Hoyer studied sound engineering at the Hochschule für Musik "Hanns Eisler". Afterwards, he was a sound director at VEB Deutsche Schallplatten Berlin and from 1977 to 1980,  for composition with Ruth Zechlin and Georg Katzer at the Academy of Arts, Berlin. His works have been performed in Europe and the US.

Film scores 
 1990: 
 1991:

Awards 
 1983: Hans Stieber Prize
 1985: Hanns Eisler Prize
 1987: Critic prize of the Berliner Zeitung

References

External links 
 
 
 

20th-century German composers
20th-century classical composers
1950 births
Living people
Musicians from Berlin